Jake T. Weber (born 12 March 1963) is an English actor, known in film for his role as Michael in Dawn of the Dead and for his role as Drew in Meet Joe Black. On television, he is best-known for playing Joe DuBois, the sleep-deprived husband of psychic Allison DuBois, in the long running drama series Medium.

In 2001 and 2002, Weber was a series regular in HBO's The Mind of the Married Man and made guest appearances on Law & Order: Criminal Intent and NYPD Blue. As of autumn 2016, Weber joined the cast, in a recurring role, of ABC's Secrets and Lies in its second season. After a recurring role on Fox's The Following, Weber has had series regular roles on Hell on Wheels and Homeland.

Early life
Weber was born in London, England, to Susan Ann Caroline (née Coriat), a British socialite, and husband Thomas Evelyn "Tommy" Weber (originally Thomas Ejnar Arkner), a racing driver who also came from a wealthy family. His father was born in Denmark, of Danish and English descent. Weber's maternal grandfather, Robert Coriat, who was born in Mogador, Morocco, was of Sephardic Jewish (Moroccan-Jewish) descent. Weber's maternal grandmother, Priscilla Weigall, was English, from an upper-class family. Priscilla's father was Sir William Ernest George Archibald Weigall, 1st Baronet, while Priscilla's maternal grandfather was Sir John Blundell Maple, 1st Baronet. Weber has one sibling, a brother Charley. Through his English maternal grandmother, Weber is a great-grandson of politician Sir William Ernest George Archibald Weigall, 1st Baronet and his wife, Grace Emily ( Blundell Maple), and a great-great-grandson of business magnate Sir John Blundell Maple, 1st Baronet and wife, Emily Harriet Merryweather.

Weber's mother, Susan, was diagnosed with depression and LSD-induced schizophrenia, and died at age 27 of a drug overdose when Weber was eight years old. His father, who sold various illegal drugs and utilized both his sons in trafficking, sold drugs to numerous international destinations and struggled with substance addiction until his death in 2006 at age 67.

In 1971, Weber's father took him and his brother to stay for a period at Villa Nellcôte, where the Rolling Stones were recording Exile on Main St. In a 2010 article for The Times, Weber recalled that his "father used him as a drug mule to bring cocaine out for Mick and Bianca Jagger's wedding."

Weber attended Summerhill School, Leiston, Suffolk. Later, he went to the United States to study at Middlebury College in Vermont, where he sang a cappella with the Dissipated Eight and majored in English literature and political science, graduating with a B.A. cum laude in 1986. He attended The Juilliard School's Drama Division as a member of Group 19 (1986–1990), which also included Laura Linney and Jeanne Tripplehorn. He also studied at Russia's famed Moscow Art Theatre.

At the 2010 Cannes film festival, as part of the Directors' Fortnight at the launching of the rock 'n roll documentary, Stones in Exile, singer Mick Jagger spoke to the crowd about the months of drug-fuelled recording sessions that produced the Stones' classic 1972 album Exile on Main Street. Jagger joked about the rarely seen original footage that reveals eight-year-old Weber rolling marijuana joints for them. Weber has reportedly stated that his drug-dealing father brought him to Keith Richards's rented French villa, Nellcôte, in the seaside town of Villefranche-sur-Mer near Nice, where the Stones were recording the album.

Career

Weber's roles were often bit parts in A-list films, beginning with that of Kyra Sedgwick's character's unnamed boyfriend in the Oliver Stone-directed period saga Born on the Fourth of July (1989) and continuing with work for such directors as Sidney Lumet (A Stranger Among Us, 1992), Alan J. Pakula (The Pelican Brief, 1993) and Martin Brest (Meet Joe Black, 1998). 

He scored one of his premier leads as Dr. Matt Crower, a kindly physician who takes charge of a young boy and protects him from a possessed sheriff in actor-turned-producer Shaun Cassidy's short-lived, but well received, supernatural drama series American Gothic (1995) on CBS. That programme did not last long; and neither did the Mike Binder sitcom The Mind of the Married Man (2001), in which Weber played one of the leads, Chicago newspaper employee Jake Berman.

After his prominent role in the 2004 remake of horror film Dawn of the Dead, Weber played Joe Dubois on Medium, the sleep-deprived husband of Allison Dubois (Patricia Arquette), a psychic intermediary who has visions that help her prevent or solve crimes. In 2016, Weber played a recurring guest-star role as the psychotherapist husband of Detective Andrea Cornell (played by series lead Juliette Lewis) on the second season of the ABC murder mystery, Secrets and Lies. The series was picked up for a full second season by ABC after a successful limited run last spring as a midseason replacement. Weber had a recurring part on the Fox series, The Following, and improvised on the Netflix series Easy. Weber also appeared in seasons 6 and 7 of the Showtime series Homeland.

Weber was cast in the 2021 film Those Who Wish Me Dead. He has performed on Broadway and off-Broadway as well.

Personal life
Weber was married to Diane Oreiro from 1995 to 1997. 
In 2017, Weber married his longtime girlfriend, Korri Culbertson. Weber has a son, Waylon from a previous relationship.

Filmography

Film

Television

References

External links
 
 

1963 births
English expatriates in the United States
English male film actors
English male stage actors
English male television actors
Juilliard School alumni
Living people
Middlebury College alumni
People educated at Summerhill School
English people of Danish descent
English people of Jewish descent
British people of Moroccan-Jewish descent
English Sephardi Jews
Mizrahi Jews
20th-century English male actors
21st-century English male actors